The Class 380 is a tri-voltage electric locomotive manufactured by Škoda for Czech railways České dráhy.

History

The Class 380 is Škoda's entry into the modern electric locomotive market. Internally designated Type 109E, the locomotives were originally conceived in 2004 and designed for operation in Austria, Germany, Hungary, Poland and Slovakia as well as the Czech Republic. The 109E Škoda has a top speed of 200 km/h and is compatible with both AC and DC catenaries, as is expected of current multisystem locomotives. The locomotives are equipped to work on three electrification systems: 3 kV DC, 25 kV 50 Hz AC and 15 kV 16.7 Hz AC, drawing power from overhead lines.

In 2005 České dráhy (ČD) ordered 20 locomotives with delivery in 2009 and certifications for service in all of the above-mentioned countries. The first locomotive was not delivered until 2010 and lacked any national service certification (only trial service certification for the Czech Republic).  As a result, České dráhy refused to accept the locomotives.

In April 2013 the locomotive received the TSI certificate and in 2015 an arbitration court ruled on the protracted dispute between ČD and Škoda Transportation regarding the late delivery of the locomotives. While the German railway authority granted approval for the locomotives at up to 200km/h in Germany, their planned use on the Prague - Dresden - Berlin - Hamburg route never happened, with ČD choosing to lease Siemens Vectron locomotives instead.

Orders of similar locomotives

Despite the problems with the approval of CD locomotives, in 2013 Deutsche Bahn signed a contract with Skoda for 6 locomotives of 109E type, designated Class 102 in Germany. The contract was also for push-pull carriages to be deployed with the locomotives on RegionalExpress services on the Munich - Nuremberg High Speed Line. TSI Certification was granted for the trains in November 2018, almost two years after the expected start of service with the trains, with the expectation of services beginning in 2019.

See also

List of České dráhy locomotive classes
List of Škoda Transportation products

References

External links 
 Locomotive 109 E (ČD) on Skoda Transportation site 
 Locomotive 109 E (ZSSK) on Skoda Transportation site } 
 Comprehensive fansite 

3000 V DC locomotives
25 kV AC locomotives
15 kV AC locomotives
Electric locomotives of the Czech Republic
Electric locomotives of Slovakia
Railway locomotives introduced in 2008
Škoda locomotives
Standard gauge locomotives of the Czech Republic
Articles containing video clips
Standard gauge locomotives of Slovakia

Bo′Bo′ electric locomotives of Europe